Opharus basalis is a moth of the family Erebidae. It was described by Francis Walker in 1856. It is found in Venezuela, Brazil and Bolivia.

References

Opharus
Moths described in 1856
Moths of South America